Kaithery is a place located near Kuthuparamaba in Kannur district of Kerala.

Etymology
" Kaithery " Name derives from "Kai" a Malayalam word that means "Hand" "thery/tharuvin" (Malayalam Word) means giving (Shake Hand :)). some people believing that the Kaithery name derives from 'KAITHARY' (Hand weaving)

Temples
Kaithery Ramapuram temple, Kaithery Bhagavathi Temple, 
pootheeyocavo temple, muthappan temple and 
Kaithery Sree Neela Karingali temple are situated here.

Transportation
The national highway passes through Kannur town.  Goa and Mumbai can be accessed on the northern side and Cochin and Thiruvananthapuram can be accessed on the southern side.  The road to the east of Iritty connects to Mysore and Bangalore.   The nearest railway station is Kannur on Mangalore-Palakkad line. 
Trains are available to almost all parts of India subject to advance booking over the internet.  There are airports at Mattanur, Mangalore and Calicut. All of them are international airports but direct flights are available only to Middle Eastern countries.

References

Villages near Kannur airport